Mark Mbofana (born 25 March 1989) is a Zimbabwean first-class cricketer who played for Mid West Rhinos. He played in 36 first-class and 38 List A matches between 2009 and 2018.

References

External links
 

1989 births
Living people
Zimbabwean cricketers
Mashonaland Eagles cricketers
Mid West Rhinos cricketers
Sportspeople from Harare